TIMCO Aviation Services, Inc. (TIMCO) was a company that provided  aircraft Maintenance, Repair and Overhaul (MRO) and interiors services for commercial and government aircraft operators. The company's MRO services include airframe MRO for Boeing and Airbus fleets at TIMCO’s corporate complex in Greensboro, North Carolina near Piedmont Triad International Airport (GSO) as well as at facilities in Macon, Georgia and Lake City, Florida. The company also provides regional jet MRO at its dedicated facility at the Cincinnati Northern Kentucky International Airport (CVG) in Cincinnati, Ohio. In 2014, the company was acquired by HAECO, a Hong Kong based division of the British conglomerate Swire Group.

Through its TIMCO Aerosystems division, the company provided aircraft interiors design and certification services and manufactured interior fittings including seats, galleys and lavatories. Timco Aerosystems was the result of the acquisition of Brice Manufacturing by Timco Aviation Services in 2002

Prior to its acquisition by HAECO in 2014, TIMCO was one of the largest independent commercial jet MRO service providers in the world.  The company supported airlines, leasing companies, and government with individually tailored aircraft care services.  TIMCO ran structures and composites repair operations at its locations, capable of handling composite and bonded aluminum honeycomb assemblies.
 
TIMCO's maintenance operations are also supported by an engine center in Oscoda, Michigan, and the company provides line maintenance operations at many airports through its TIMCO LineCare network.

References

External links 
 Company website

Companies based in Greensboro, North Carolina
Manufacturing companies based in North Carolina
Aircraft component manufacturers of the United States
Airliner seating
Manufacturing companies established in 1990
Manufacturing companies disestablished in 2014
2014 mergers and acquisitions